The 23rd Pau Grand Prix was a non-Championship motor race, run to Formula One rules, held on 15 April 1963 at Pau Circuit, the street circuit in Pau. The race was run over 100 laps of the circuit, and was won by Jim Clark in a Lotus 25. Clark and his team-mate Trevor Taylor dominated the race from start to finish, with their nearest rival finishing the race five laps adrift.

Results

References
 "The Formula One Record Book", John Thompson, 1974.

Pau Grand Prix
Pau Grand Prix
1963 in French motorsport